The 1979–80 season was the 42nd season in the history of Wigan Athletic F.C. and their second as a professional club in the Football League. 

The club finished the season in 6th place.

In the FA Cup, the club achieved an away victory against Second Division side Chelsea, reaching the Fourth Round for the first time in their history before being knocked out by Everton. The club did not progress beyond the first round in the League Cup. Peter Houghton was the team's top goalscorer with a total of 15 league goals (16 in all competitions). Goalkeeper John Brown won the club's Player of the Year award.

Player statistics
Note: Numbers in brackets are appearances as a substitute.

Source:

References

Wigan Athletic F.C. seasons
Wigan Athletic F.C.